Raymond “R.J” Higgs (born 24 January 1991 in Freeport) is a Bahamian long jumper. He competed in the long jump event at the 2012 Summer Olympics.

Personal bests

Achievements

Higgs competed collegiately in the United States for the University of Arkansas Razorbacks. In 2012, he won the long jump in the Southeastern Conference Outdoor Championships and finished third at the NCAA Outdoor Track and Field Championships.

References

External links

Bahamian high jump record progression (run123.one)

1991 births
Living people
Bahamian male long jumpers
Olympic athletes of the Bahamas
Athletes (track and field) at the 2012 Summer Olympics
Commonwealth Games competitors for the Bahamas
Athletes (track and field) at the 2014 Commonwealth Games
World Athletics Championships athletes for the Bahamas
People from Freeport, Bahamas
Arkansas Razorbacks men's track and field athletes
Athletes (track and field) at the 2015 Pan American Games
Pan American Games competitors for the Bahamas